Alexander Aloysius Anderson (June 17, 1894 – November 14, 1953) was an American football offensive guard who played one season in the American Professional Football Association (APFA) for the Washington Senators. He played in 1921, appearing in one game.

References

1894 births
1953 deaths
American football offensive guards
Players of American football from Massachusetts
Washington Senators (NFL) players
Georgetown Hoyas football players
Holy Cross Crusaders football players
Boston College Eagles football players
Sportspeople from Somerville, Massachusetts